The Legend Financial Group Classic presented by Cynergies Solutions was a golf tournament on the Nationwide Tour. It was played from 2005 to 2007 at Stonewater Golf Course in Highland Heights, Ohio, U.S. The 2007 purse was $525,000, with $94,500 going to the winner.

Winners

Bolded golfers graduated to the PGA Tour via the final Nationwide Tour money list.

See also
DAP Championship, a Web.com Tour Finals event in the Cleveland suburb of Beachwood beginning in 2016
Rust-Oleum Championship, a current Web.com Tour event that was played in Cleveland from 2014 to 2015
Greater Cleveland Open, a Web.com Tour event from 1990 to 2001
Cleveland Open, a PGA Tour event from 1963 to 1972

External links
PGATOUR.com Tournament Website

Former Korn Ferry Tour events
Golf in Ohio
Recurring sporting events established in 2005
Recurring sporting events disestablished in 2007